N Dis Life is the fourth and final album of original music by Native Hawaiian-American singer Israel "Iz" Kamakawiwo'ole before his death, released in 1996. It reached #3 at Top World Music Albums.

Track listing 
"Hiʻilawe" (traditional) – 4:44
"In This Life" (Reid, Shamblin) – 4:09
"Waiʻalae" (traditional) – 2:43
"Starting All Over Again" (Mitchell) – 3:59
"Living in a Sovereign Land" (Cambern, Kamakawiwoʻole) – 4:38
"ʻOpae E" (Aluki, Paki) – 4:09
"Aloha Kuʻu Pua" (Isaacs) – 2:30
"Johnny Mahoe" (Beazley) – 4:54
"Lover of Mine" (Bilyeu, Holomalia) – 2:45
"Yokozuna" (Chock) – 3:39
"Na Ka Pueo/Keyhole Hula" (Machado, traditional) – 4:40
"The Fly" (traditional) – 2:27

References 

1996 albums
Israel Kamakawiwoʻole albums
Na Hoku Hanohano Award-winning albums